Parishan Lake is a lake in Iran. The Parishan Lake is in Jereh and Baladeh District in Fars Province and is the largest freshwater lake in the country. It receives only very small amount of water from feeder rivers and the whole lake or wetland is a protected area, as it is considered a globally significant wetland ecosystem.

The Protected Zone of Arzhan and Parishan
Another lake in this area is that of Arzhan. The whole protected area is called "Arzhan National Park." This area is an important sanctuary for birds.

Project Lion

In the past, the Asiatic lion used to occur in this place, besides other parts of Iran. Nowadays, in the wilderness of Eurasia, the only members of this race of lions occur in and around Gir Forest, in Kathiawar Peninsula, India. There was a plan to bring in Gir lions during 1977, but there were issues, and so it did not get fulfilled. This area includes the village of Arzhan, and is of agricultural importance, and bringing in lions would mean setting aside farmland, and settling farmers elsewhere. This happens to be a reason why it is difficult to reintroduce lions from Gir Forest to another place within India. Nevertheless, Iran's intention to restore its population of lions would continue into the 21st century, and in February 2019, Iran obtained a male named 'Kamran' from Bristol Zoo in the United Kingdom, followed in June by a female named 'Eilda' from Dublin Zoo in Ireland, and lodged them at Tehran Zoological Garden in a bid to reproduce and reintroduce lions in the wild.

See also
 Kazerun
 Maharloo Lake
 Wildlife of Iran

References

Parishan
Landforms of Fars Province
Biosphere reserves of Iran